The Accident may refer to:


Film and television
 The Accident (film), a 1963 French film
 The Accident (TV series), a 2019 British drama serial
 "The Accident" (Dynasty 1984), a television episode
 "The Accident" (Dynasty 1986), a television episode
 "The Accident" (Homicide: Life on the Street), or "Subway", a television episode

Literature
 The Accident (Wiesel novel) or Day, a 1962 novel by Elie Wiesel
 The Accident, a 2010 novel by Ismail Kadare
 The Accident, a 1955 novel by Dexter Masters
 The Accident, a 2014 novel by Chris Pavone

Astronomy
 WISE 1534–1043, a brown dwarf referred to as "The Accident"

See also 
 Accident (disambiguation)